Don Bosco Technical Institute of Makati, or simply "Don Bosco Makati." is a private Catholic educational institution owned and operated by the Salesians of Don Bosco (SDB). Its campus is located at Chino Roces Avenue Makati, Metro Manila, Philippines. In January 1954, the cornerstone of Don Bosco Makati was laid down, during the term of then, Servant of God Fr. Carlo Braga, SDB, as Provincial. At the same year, construction of the first building was completed which housed the chapel, the convent, a youth center, and the auditorium.

Salesian priests namely Fr. Quaranta, Fr. Jua, Fr. Righetti, Fr. Patrick Ryan, and Brother Nicolino Tambascia started to work at the Youth Center. In January 1955 Religious clubs, youth groups and catechism classes were formed. In June of the same year the Grade School edifice was built. Enrollees for Grades V, VI and for first year in the secondary level were accepted. In 1956 the first thirty six (36) Grade VI pupils were the first graduates from Don Bosco Makati.

Programs

Elementary Department

The Elementary Department advocates information literacy as its approach to the basic curriculum required by the Department of Education. The Elementary Department emerged to have the best educational management information system in the Division of Pasay Schools. Computer aided design was integrated in drafting the technical curriculum through the assistance of the Advance Technology Solutions Technologies of Singapore. Equipment and facilities for the Electronic Data Processing were installed for the networking of all records in the Accounting, Registrar, Testing and Personnel Offices.

Levels of Studies:

Grades 1–6
Kindergarten

Principal

Mr. Dondon B. Buensuceso

Assistant Principals

Mrs. Theresa V. Anog -  Assistant Principal for Student Affairs
Mrs. Ma. Dolores F. Bayocboc - Assistant Principal for Academic Affairs
Fr. Cyril Vincent Noel, SDB - Assistant Principal for Pastoral Affairs

Others
Ms. Marilou Sibayan - Student Activity coordinator
Mrs. Cecile Sumanqui - Research Associate

Junior High School Department

The Don Bosco Technical Institute-Junior High School is a Catholic lower secondary school for boys. The department features up-to-date facilities in the fields of academic, technical, spiritual and athletics.

Curriculum

The curriculum is as prescribed by the Department of Education — Mathematics, Science, English, Filipino, Araling Panlipunan, Christian Living, and MAPEH (Music, Arts, Physical Education, Health). With this, the student is offered a dual curriculum, with academic plus technical.

Grades 7 and 8 - General technology (electronics-electrical technology, automotive-mechanical technology, computer technology and industrial drafting technology)
Grades 9 and 10 - One specialization based on the results of an exam, quarterly grade, and student's choice (the 7 specializations are listed below)

During the first two years in high school, a Bosconian is exposed to a general technical education covering measurements, hand tools and light power tools applied to light metal work and simple electrical circuits together with a more advanced information technology (computer subject) curriculum. For the last two years, there is a choice of one of these technical specializations:

Automotive Design Technology
Mechanical Design Technology
Electrical Systems Design Technology
Electronics Design Technology
Creative Design Technology
Information & Communications Technology
Graphics Design and Animation
Alongside these specializations, all Grade 9 and 10 Bosconians also take classes in CAD (computer-aided design) using Autodesk AutoCAD.

Principal
Mr. Darwin B. Buensuceso

Assistant Principals
Miss Ma. Luisa Z. Brutas - Academic affairs
Mr. Reuben Calabio - Student affairs
Mr. Hernando Los Banos - Technical affairs
Fr. Juvelan Paul Samia, SDB - Spiritual Moderator

Senior High School 

Principal
Mr. Alfredo A. Lozanta, Jr.

Assistant Principals
Mr. Marlowe Ingles - Academic affairs
Mr. Ernesto "Jay" Tauyan, Jr.- Student affairs
Fr. Juvelan Paul Samia, SDB- Spiritual Moderator
Curriculum
 Grade 11
 Grade 12

TVET (Technical-Vocational Education and Training) Center

It is a Home and School for the poor and out-of-school youth where they learn various technical skills of their choice as a means to gain decent employment. The center is managed and run by the Partners of the Salesians of Don Bosco.

The course can be learned in one year. The first ten months of training are spent in the center to build the trainees' theoretical foundation (30%) and their hands-on training experience (70%).

On the eleventh month, all trainees are assigned for a 5-month On-the-job training in selected companies to advance their technical skills and firm up their attitude as a means of preparing them for the exciting world of work. This orientation scheme initiates the graduates to an industrial setting that demands hard work, quality performance and proper work values.

Courses Offered
Automobile mechanic
General electrician
Fitter machinist
Refrigeration and air-conditioning mechanic
Industrial electronics

Library and Learning Resource Center

In 1999 Fr. Caesar Dizon, SDB, former rector of Don Bosco Technical Institute-Makati, spearheaded a special project and organized a working team to conceptualize the development of a new learning center called the "Mulitiple Intelligence Center. It is patterned from the theory of Dr. Howard Gardner who believed that every man has his own kind of intelligence and potential as a person.

The MIC was conceived to make students, teachers and personnel to be in touch with technological change. This change reflects a major challenge present in today's society—that is, the use of modern technology in all aspects of humanity. The MIC became a learning center equipped with state-of-the-art technology and incorporating modern theories and principles.

On August 15, 2000, after its blessing by the Rector, the new MIC became functional with the appointment of Ms. Ofelia Dantes as its first head.

Notable alumni

 Ali Atienza, politician
 Jun Aristorenas, actor, director, dancer, producer, writer
 Kim Atienza, TV host and politician

 LA Tenorio, athlete, Philippine Basketball Association
Niño Muhlach, actor

 Ronnie Ricketts, actor
 Mark Meily, film director
 Herminio Coloma Jr., former Secretary of the Presidential Communications Operations Office
 Raymond Bagatsing, actor
 Robert P. Galang, President & CEO of Cignal TV & TV5 Network Inc
 Perfecto De Castro, guitarist, original member of Rivermaya
Miguel and Paolo Guico, Guitarist and Vocalist of the band Ben&Ben

Clubs

• Boscorale, the school's representative choral group, is one of the known all-male High School choirs in the Philippines. The Boscorale was said to be the school's pride when it comes to chorale singing due to its various achievements from winning in various prestige chorale competitions in the metro. To date, the young male choir have already achieved 16 notable prizes: 6 championships, 9 runners-up and a minor award. The Boscorale is currently holding the "back-to-back" championship titles in the Annual Ayala Interschool Christmas Caroling Competition and the Musica FEUropa - High School Category Competition.

Enlightened and moved by the spirit of St. John Bosco, the Boscorale aims to be in melody and harmony with the Lord Almighty, for they believe that "a school without music is like a body without a soul." -St. John Bosco

• Teatro Busko, the school's official Theatre club was established in the '90s but was re-established in 2015. The club produced plays and performances every school year to showcase the talent of its members. The club also joined competitions outside the school. The club won the Best Picture award and a handful of awards during the Makati Theater Festival last 2018. The club also joined SIGABO, a National Speech Choir competition organized by CMLI. The club first joined in 2016. The club joined again in 2018 and was one of the Top 10 Finalist. In 2019, the club was declared SIGABO 2019 CHAMPION, bringing great pride to Don Bosco Technical Institute-Makati.

• DBXTreme, the school's dance group. Joined Skechers Street Dance Battle 8.

References

External links
 School Homepage 
 History in Timeline
 Salesians of Don Bosco website
 sa Don Bosco Foundation website

Salesian schools
Salesian secondary schools
Catholic elementary schools in Metro Manila
Catholic secondary schools in Metro Manila
Makati
Boys' schools in the Philippines
Educational institutions established in 1954
1954 establishments in the Philippines
Schools in Makati